Kaule may refer to:

Kaule, Sagarmatha, Nepal
Kaule, Bagmati, Nepal
Kaule, Narayani, Nepal